Dylan Jones is a professor of physics and atmospheric scientist at the University of Toronto.

Education and Research 
Jones received his undergraduate degree from Harvard University in 1990, a Masters in Applied Physics from Harvard in 1994, and a PhD in Earth and Planetary Sciences from Harvard in 1998. Jones' research is focused on integrating measurements of atmospheric composition with global three-dimensional models of chemistry and transport to develop a better understanding of how pollution influences the chemical and dynamical state of the atmosphere.

Career 
Jones was a researcher in the Division of Engineering and Applied Sciences at Harvard University from 1998 to 2004, whereupon he took up a faculty position in the Department of Physics at the University of Toronto. He was promoted to full professor in 2016.

References

External links
Atmospheric Physics and Composition Modelling Group at University of Toronto

Living people
Year of birth missing (living people)
African-American scientists
African-American educators
21st-century Canadian physicists
Academic staff of the University of Toronto
Harvard College alumni
Harvard University alumni
American expatriates in Canada
21st-century African-American people
African-American physicists